Capitophorus elaeagni, known generally as artichoke aphid, is a species of aphid in the family Aphididae. Other common names include the thistle aphid and oleaster-thistle aphid. It is found in Europe.

References

Further reading

 

Articles created by Qbugbot
Insects described in 1894
Macrosiphini
Hemiptera of Europe